Wierzbna  is a village in the administrative district of Gmina Żarów, within Świdnica County, Lower Silesian Voivodeship, in south-western Poland.

The village has a population of 600.

References

Wierzbna